Phomopsis asparagicola is a plant pathogen that causes Phomopsis blight in asparagus.

References

External links
 USDA ARS Fungal Database

Fungal plant pathogens and diseases
Stem vegetable diseases
asparagicola